Leonor Rodríguez de Castro (died after 20 December 1275) was an infanta of the Kingdom of Castile as the third wife of Philip of Castile.

Biography 
Her parents were Rodrigo Fernández de Castro, Lord of Cigales, Mucientes, and Santa Olalla and Leonor González de Lara.
She was buried in the Convent of San Felices de Amaya, a convent of the Order of Calatrava, currently in a state of ruin, in the province of Burgos, where her only son is also buried.

Marriage and children 
In 1269, she married Philip of Castile, brother of King Alfonso X, who died in 1274, one year before Leonor. They were the parents of:

 Philip of Castile. He died in childhood and was buried in the Convent of San Felices de Amaya.
 Beatriz Fernández of Castile (? – 1340). Infanta Blanche, daughter of Alfonso III of Portugal and granddaughter of Alfonso X bequeathed her the sum of 2000 maravedís in her will dated 15 April 1321. She appears often in the charters of the Abbey of Santa María la Real de Las Huelgas, in Burgos where she was a nun.  On 23 January 1295 she made a donation of the village of San Cristobal del Monte to the council of Belorado, mentioning that it had been given to her by King Sancho IV and declaring herself daughter of Philip of Castile.

References

Bibliography

External links 

 
 Ficha genealógica de Leonor Rodríguez de Castro. Fundación Casa ducal de Medinaceli

1275 deaths
Castilian infantas
13th-century Castilians
13th-century Spanish women
Year of birth unknown